William Charles Clamp VC (28 October 1892 – 9 October 1917) was a Scottish recipient of the Victoria Cross, the highest and most prestigious award for gallantry in the face of the enemy that can be awarded to British and Commonwealth forces.

Clamp was born on 28 October 1892 to Charles and Christina Dundas Clamp, of Flemington, Motherwell.

He was 24 years old, and a corporal in the 6th Battalion, The Yorkshire Regiment (Alexandra, Princess of Wales's Own), British Army when he was awarded the VC for actions on 9 October 1917 at the Battle of Poelcappelle, Belgium which led to his death.

Citation

Clamp is commemorated on the Tyne Cot Memorial. His Victoria Cross is displayed at the Green Howards Museum, Richmond, North Yorkshire, England.

References

Monuments to Courage (David Harvey, 1999)
The Register of the Victoria Cross (This England, 1997)
Scotland's Forgotten Valour (Graham Ross, 1995)
VCs of the First World War - Passchendaele 1917 (Stephen Snelling, 1998)

External links
 Salvation Army
 

1891 births
1917 deaths
People from Motherwell
British World War I recipients of the Victoria Cross
Green Howards soldiers
British Army personnel of World War I
British military personnel killed in World War I
Cameronians soldiers
British Army recipients of the Victoria Cross
Military personnel from Lanarkshire